"This Man Is Mine" is a song recorded by the rock band Heart. It was released in 1982 as the first single from the band's sixth studio album Private Audition.

Background
The song is in homage to The Supremes, which can also be inferred from the video of this song.

Reception
Cash Box said it has "a smokey groove that will be a pleasant revelation to many."  Billboard said that "Paced by snapping fingers and lush choral harmonies, it's a midtempo showcase for Ann Wilson's sultry vocal."

Charts
"This Man Is Mine" was the only charting single released from Private Audition, peaking at number thirty-three on the U.S. Billboard Hot 100.

References 

Heart (band) songs
1982 singles
Songs written by Ann Wilson
Songs written by Nancy Wilson (rock musician)
Songs written by Sue Ennis
1982 songs
Epic Records singles